Elegant Prince (15 March 1974 - 2000) was a Thoroughbred racehorse sold for a world-record $715,000 ($ million inflation adjusted) in 1975. He never raced nor had success as a breeding stallion.

Background
Elegant Prince was a chestnut horse with a white blaze bred in Kentucky by Leslie Combs II of Spendthrift Farm and Canadian oilman Frank McMahon. He was sired by Raise a Native, an American racehorse who was unbeaten in four races and was named American Champion Two-Year-Old Colt by Turf and Sports Digest in 1963. Elegant Prince's dam Gay Hostess was a highly-successful broodmare, having produced Majestic Prince and Crowned Prince (Dewhurst Stakes) from two previous coverings by Raise a Native. Her other descendants have included Real Quiet, Caracolero and The Derby winner Secreto.

At the Keeneland Sales in July 1975 the yearling was sold for a then world-recond price of $715,000, with Franklin Groves winning the auction ahead of the Canadian Ted Burnett. He broke the record set a year earlier by another Spendthrift graduate Kentucky Gold. Both Majestic Prince and Crowned Prince had previously held the record.

Racing career
Elegant Prince was trained in the United States and was later transferred to Ireland. He did not race in either country.

Stud record
Elegant Prince was retired to stud in 1979 but had little success as a sire of winners. He died in 2000.

Pedigree

References

1974 racehorse births
Racehorses bred in Kentucky
Thoroughbred family 4-d